Filipino Australians (Filipino: Mga Australyanong Pilipino) are Australians of Filipino ancestry. Filipino Australians are one of the largest groups within the global Filipino diaspora. At the 2021 census, 408,836 people stated that they had Filipino ancestry (whether alone or in combination with another ancestry), representing 1.6% of the Australian population. In 2021, the Australian Bureau of Statistics estimated that there were 310,620 Australian residents born in the Philippines.

Population

Currently Filipinos are the third largest Asian Australian immigrant group behind Chinese Australians and Indian Australians. At the 2021 census, 408,836 people stated that they had Filipino ancestry (whether alone or in combination with another ancestry), representing 1.6% of the Australian population. In 2021, the Australian Bureau of Statistics estimated that there were 310,620 Australian residents born in the Philippnes.

At the 2021 census, the states with the largest numbers of people reporting Filipino ancestry were: New South Wales (152,804), Victoria (95,186), Queensland (73,805), Western Australia (46,785) and South Australia (21,257).

Females account for 61% while males represent 39% of Filipino Australians born in the Philippines.

History
Filipinos were excluded from entering Australia under the White Australia policy. As a consequence, their numbers in Australia remained minimal; confined to descendants of those few Filipinos who had migrated to the north west pearling areas of Western Australia and the sugar cane plantations of Queensland prior to 1901; until the abolition of racially selective immigration policies in 1966. The 1901 census had recorded 700 Filipinos in Australia.

Martial law in the Philippines, declared by former Philippine president Ferdinand Marcos in 1972, and the renunciation of the White Australia policy made Australia an attractive destination for Filipino emigrants, particularly skilled workers. Many Filipinos also settled in Australia from the 1970s onward as either migrant workers or the spouses of Australian citizens. Marriages between Filipinos and Australians rose very sharply from 1978, peaked in 1986, and remained high as of 2000, despite a dip in the early 1990s. The 1980s were the period of the greatest Filipino immigration, with 1987-1988 being the peak year.

Notable people

Philippine-born
 Aljin Abella, actor from the TV series Power Rangers Jungle Fury
 Migo Adecer, singer, dancer, model, and actor
 Jhoanna Aguila, singer, and The Voice Australia Season 3 contestant
 Alyssa Alano, actress and model
 Leila Alcasid, singer and songwriter
 Joey Mead King, model, VJ, and TV and events host 
 Shar Mae Amor, singer and former Paradiso Girls member
 Hannah Arnold, model and beauty queen, crowned Binibining Pilipinas 2021
 Mig Ayesa, theatre actor and rock vocalist
 Merlinda Bobis, writer
 Shey Bustamante, reality show contestant
 Arianne Caoili, chess player
 Israel Cruz, singer
 Kathleen de Leon Jones, original Hi-5 member
 Felino Dolloso, theatre actor
 Ben Gonzales, rugby league player
 Sef Gonzales, convicted murderer
 Nathalie Hart, actress
 Fely Irvine, former Hi-5 member
 Jal Joshua, singer, dancer, and Australia's Got Talent Season 3 1st runner-up
 Alfred Nicdao, actor
 Yshrael Pascual, singer and The Voice Australia Season 1 contestant
 Jim Paredes, singer, songwriter, member of APO Hiking Society trio
 Rose Porteous, socialite
 RJ Rosales, actor and musical theatre performer
 Claire Ruiz, actress, singer, dancer, and model
 Jerson Trinidad, singer and The Voice Australia Season 1 contestant

Filipino ancestry
 Abigail Adriano, singer and The Voice Kids Australia contestant
 Chelsea Castillo, singer and Australia's Got Talent Season 3 finalist
 Chris Cayzer, actor and singer 
 Kate Ceberano, singer
 Genesis Cerezo, beatboxer and Australia's Got Talent Season 6 finalist
 Sarah Christophers, former actress
 Elizabeth Clenci, model and beauty queen, Miss Grand International 2017 2nd runner-up
 Jessica Connelly, singer and former reality show contestant
 Anne Curtis, actress, model, and singer
 Jasmine Curtis-Smith, actress and model 
 Rod Davies, wing for Queensland Reds Super Rugby team
 Jason Day, golfer
 Ashley del Mundo, actress and former reality show contestant 
 Ezekiel Dimaguila, reality show contestant
 Stef Draper, reality show contestant
 Kai Espenido, reality show contestant
 Alyssa Exala, reality show contestant 
 Karen Gallman, model and beauty queen crowned Binibining Pilipinas Intercontinental 2018 and Miss Intercontinental 2018
 Ylona Garcia, singer
 Kevin Gordon, Gold Coast Titans Rugby League player 
 Maxwell Gratton - CEO, Flying Disc Australia
 Catriona Gray, singer and model crowned Miss World Philippines 2016, Miss Universe Philippines 2018 and Miss Universe 2018
 Payne Haas, Brisbane Broncos Rugby League player
 Sheralyn Hill, singer, The X Factor Australia Season 6 finalist, and former TRILL member
 Jessica Jade, singer, The X Factor Australia Season 6 finalist, and former TRILL member
 Mojo Juju, musician
 Clinton Kane, singer
 Kelebek, rapper, The X Factor Australia Season 5 finalist, and former Third Degree member
 Stephanie Lacerna, singer and Idol Philippines contestant
 Philip Lampart, reality show contestant
 Michael Letts, rugby player
 Vanessa Librea, singer and The Voice Australia Season 11 contestant
 Jericho Malabonga, winner of the fourth series of Australian Survivor
 Reyanna Maria, singer and rapper
 Janette McBride, former actress
 Michael McCoy, reality show contestant
 Reef McInnes, Australian rules footballer
 Natalie Mendoza, actress (Hotel Babylon)
 Rebecca Jackson Mendoza, actress, singer, and dancer
 Paul Merciadez, singer, dancer, and member of dance group Justice Crew
 Bella Micucci, singer and The Voice Teens Philippines Season 2 contestant
 Patrick Miller, Married at First Sight Australia Season 5 star
 Montaigne, singer
 Seann Miley Moore, singer, The X Factor U.K. Season 12 finalist, and The Voice Australia Season 10 contestant
 Bobby Morley, actor from Home and Away and The 100 TV series
 Charlotte Nicdao, actress
 Cyrell Paule, Married at First Sight Australia Season 6 star
 John Pearce, singer, dancer, member of Justice Crew, and member of children's music group The Wiggles
 Lenny Pearce, singer, dancer, and member of Justice Crew
 Mick Pennisi, basketball player
 Chad Peralta, singer
 Marlisa Punzalan, winner of the sixth series of The X Factor Australia
 Iain Ramsay, professional football (soccer) player. Has chosen to represent the Philippines national football team at International level.
 James Reid, actor, singer, and dancer
 Lauren Reid, model, actress, events and television host, and blogger
 Sheldon Riley, singer, The Voice Australia Season 7 2nd runner-up, The X Factor Australia Season 8 finalist, and former Time and Place member
 Marcus Rivera, Miss Saigon  theatre performer, film actor, and vocal coach.
 Nina Robertson, beauty queen crowned Miss Earth Australia 2017
 Marissa Saroca, singer and The Voice of the Philippines Season 1 contestant
 Nicole Schmitz, beauty queen and model crowned Binibining Pilipinas 2012, Miss International 2012 Top 15 finalist
 Naomi Sequeira, actress and singer, Hanging with Adam & Naomi, The Evermoor Chronicles
 Monique Shippen, model, singer and beauty queen crowned Miss Earth Australia 2018 and Miss International Australia 2019
 Flip Simmons, theatre actor and musician
 Starley, singer
 Calmell Teagle, singer, The X Factor Australia Season 8 finalist, and former AYA member
 Melanie Vallejo, actress from the TV series Power Rangers: Mystic Force
 Michelle Vergara Moore, actress from the TV series The Time of Our Lives
 Matthew Victor Pastor, film director
 Iya Villania, singer, actress and model
 Cyrus Villanueva, winner of the seventh series of The X Factor Australia
 Craig Wing, Australian Rugby League player (South Sydney Rabbitohs)
 Gwen Zamora, actress and model

See also

 Australia–Philippines relations
 Embassy of the Philippines, Canberra

References

External links
 The Philippine Consulate General in Sydney
 Embassy of the Philippines in Canberra
 Pinoy Australia Information Forum
 Bayanihan The Community Newspaper of Australia
 Ang Kalatas Newspaper
 Filipin-Oz News of Filipino's in Australia and Business Directory
 Philtimes.com.au Australia's Filipino newspaper

Asian Australian
Immigration to Australia
Australia